Vania King and Arantxa Rus were the defending champions, having won the event in 2013, but both players chose not to participate.

Kiki Bertens and Johanna Larsson won the tournament, defeating Tatiana Búa and Daniela Seguel in the final, 7–6(7–4), 6–4.

Seeds

Draw

References 
 Draw

Open Gdf Suez De Cagnes-Sur-Mer Alpes-Maritimes - Doubles